The Good Comrade (German: Ich hatt' einen Kameraden), or I Had a Comrade, is a 1923 German silent film directed by Hans Felsing and starring Willy Kaiser-Heyl, Henri Peters-Arnolds and Margit Barnay. It takes its title from a popular song.

Cast
Willy Kaiser-Heyl as Bürgermeister Ritter  
Henri Peters-Arnolds as Dr. Joachim Ritter  
Margit Barnay as Dorothee 
Albert Maurer as Student Wolf  
Fritz Alten as Kommandant Bruyère  
Georg John as Marodeur  
Franz Stephans as Marodeur  
Fritz Ruß as Amtsdiener 
Paul Rehkopf as Schuster Faber

References

External links

1923 films
Films of the Weimar Republic
German silent feature films
German black-and-white films
Films directed by Hans Felsing
1923 drama films
German drama films
Silent drama films
1920s German films